Danny Banda (born c. 1938) is a retired Canadian football player who played for the Saskatchewan Roughriders.

References

Living people
1930s births
Canadian football running backs
Canadian football linebackers
Saskatchewan Roughriders players